"Whispers (Gettin' Louder)" is a song written by Barbara Acklin and David Scott, recorded and released by Jackie Wilson in 1966.

Background
"Whispers (Gettin' Louder)" features instrumentation by the Funk Brothers and backing vocals by The Andantes. The song's B-side, "(Far from) The Fairest of Them All", was written by Buddy Scott and Jimmy Radcliffe and originally intended for presentation to Ray Charles.

Chart performance
The single peaked at No. 11 on the Billboard Hot 100 singles chart and No. 5 on the Top Selling R&B Singles chart.

Cover versions
In 1967, The Isley Brothers included it on their Soul on the Rocks LP.

References

1966 songs
1966 singles
Brunswick Records singles
Jackie Wilson songs
Songs written by Barbara Acklin